The Harz Run is a fun run and walking event in the Harz mountains of Germany that has been organised since the 1970s by the Wernigerode Skiing Club (Skiklub Wernigerode 1911) and takes place on the last Saturday of April. There is also a 25 km route from Wernigerode to Benneckenstein and a 28 km course from Benneckenstein to Nordhausen.

From its start on the edge of the town of Wernigerode it initially climbs the Hilmersberg and then continues to the Zillierbach Reservoir. After 11.5 km the first drink stop is reached at Neue Hütte. The route forks at Lange at the 20 km point. Whilst the 25 km runners turn off right to Benneckenstein, the ultra marathon runners run straight ahead in a southerly direction. Shortly beyond Trautenstein they are joined by the 28 km runners from  Benneckenstein. The route continues via Sophienhof to Netzkater. Next comes the second longest climb to the Poppenberg, whose peak is reached at the 39 km point. The course runs through Neustadt/Harz and Rüdigsdorf to its finish in the Albert Kuntz Stadium at Nordhausen.

The route is quite demanding due to its near-natural course on small tracks and the height difference of 1200 m that has to be overcome.

The instigator for the runs was Herbert Pohl of Wernigerode who died in 1993. In East Germany the organisation of the run was sometimes banned by the authorities. In 2004 the 25th Harzquerung was combined with the 4th German Ultra Marathon Championships.

Statistics

Course records 

 Men: 3:23:47, Karsten Sörensen, 1996
 Women: 4:00:04, Heidrun Peckert, 2005

Fastest runner of 2007 

 Men: Andreas Schneidewind, 3:37:09
 Women: Nicole Kresse, 4:30:52

No. of finishers in 2007 

 51 km: 334 (272 men and 62 women)
 25 km: 75 (57 men and 18 women)
 28 km: 68 (51 men and 17 women)

List of victors

External links 

 Official website
 Report from the German Ultra Marathon Championships as part of the Harzquerung in 2004 at dromeus.de
 Run reports from the 2004 Harzquerung at frau-werwolf.de
 Run reports from the 2007 Harzquerung at marathon4you.de
 Harzquerung at steppenhahn.de with links to other run reports.

Ultramarathons
Athletics competitions in Germany
Sport in Saxony-Anhalt
Sport in Thuringia
Harz